"I Dies from Love" was the eighth episode of the first series of the British television series, Upstairs, Downstairs. The episode is set in the summer of 1907.

"I Dies from Love" was among the episodes omitted from Upstairs, Downstairs''' initial Masterpiece Theatre broadcast in 1974, and was consequently not shown on US television until 1989.

Cast
Regular cast
Evin Crowley (Emily) 
Guest cast
Aimée Delamain (Lady Templeton)
Yolande Turner (Mrs Van Groeben)
Charles Lamb (Harris)
Tom Marshall (William)
Patricia Hamilton (Mrs Fellows)
Robin Wentworth (the Policeman)
Carl Bernard (Waterman)
Christopher Wray (Lowe)

Plot
Emily, the Irish scullery maid at 165 Eaton Place, has fallen deeply and hopelessly in love with William, a young footman who comes to tea in the servants' hall while his mistress, Mrs. Van Groeben, an obnoxious, conceited, nouveau riche woman who is new to London from Cape Town, South Africa, is calling on Lady Marjorie in connection with a Charity Committee that she is involved with.

Also involved with the committee is Marjorie's best friend, Lady Prudence Fairfax, (who becomes annoyed with the newcomer when she brags about her daughter Wilhelmina becoming great friends with Lady Prudence's daughter, Agatha, whom she had only met the night before) and Lady Templeton, an elderly, acerbic and slightly eccentric lady who can't stand being cooped up with a herd of women as she complains to an amused Hudson. Marjorie however sees her as a good person, and mentions that Richard says she is the sanest person he knows.Emily's kitchen work is suffering as a result of her ardor for William, (in this episode she is also pulling double duty as under-house parlourmaid, which allows her to work with Rose) and she is receiving a great deal more verbal lashings from Mrs. Bridges. An example is when Emily mistakenly put salt into the sugar jar, which ruins one of Mrs. Bridges' puddings.

Meanwhile, Mrs. Van Groeben pulls Lady Marjorie aside and tells her that she thinks that their charity should only be given to a few privileged servants, which annoys Lady Marjorie.  Lady Marjorie sharply tells her guest that the committee's efforts are to help everyone in domestic service, and not just a certain few.  The uncaring Mrs. Van Groeben then changes the subject, attempting to impress Lady Marjorie with news of a house party held by Lord Nicholson, only to be stunned when Marjorie fondly refers to him as "Toby Nicholson", revealing that she is a close friend of his.

Emily and William spend their days off together often, and Emily falls deeply in love with William and wants nothing more than to marry him. But Mrs Van Groeben, who is somewhat unsympathetic and more than a bit snobbish (her tendency to be condescending to everyone makes her immediately disliked by Lady Marjorie and Lady Prudence, and absolutely loathed by Lady Templeton), forbids the relationship out of envy and firmly orders William to stop seeing her, bribing him with promises of a new uniform and an increased status in her household. The cowardly William obeys, not wanting to jeopardize his promotions, claiming he never saw Emily as anything more than "a bit of fun."

Meanwhile, back at 165 Eaton Place, Lady Marjorie, in a much more kindly manner than Mrs. Van Groeben, tells Emily that William cannot see her anymore, and Emily's heart breaks. Lady Marjorie is more sympathetic towards Emily's situation because she had been through the same thing with her son James's friend, Charles Hammond.

The other below stairs members, with the exception of Rose, are too preoccupied to notice Emily's misery. Mrs Bridges continues her vicious tongue lashings at Emily, taunting her about William's real intentions and mocking her dreams of marriage, until Rose, discovering what is going on and hearing the cook's spiteful taunting, harshly puts a stop to it and comforts a sobbing Emily.

Emily sends William a love letter, penned by Rose, declaring how much she loves him. However, the next morning, while bringing a hamper of food for a servants' outing to Hampstead Heath (the reason for the meetings that Lady Marjorie had with Lady Prudence, Lady Templeton and Mrs. Van Groeben), William cruelly ignores a distraught Emily; while Harris, the Van Groebens' head coachman, returns her unopened letter and kindly explains to a broken-hearted Emily that he has a lot of new duties. He then encourages her to look forward to the outing and the grand time she would have.

The next day, during the preparations for the servants' outing, Emily, overcome with grief, commits suicide by hanging herself in her room. A sobbing Rose, who discovered Emily's dead body when she was sent to get her for the outing, tells Hudson what happened.  Hudson tells Lady Marjorie the news and while he goes to explain the situation to the other servants, a shaken Lady Marjorie reveals that her kitchen-maid has "had an accident" to Lady Prudence, Lady Templeton and an uncaring Mrs. Van Groeben.

Meanwhile, below stairs, Mrs. Bridges is sitting in her chair, crying brokenheartedly, and feeling very guilty, the devastated Bellamy staff stay behind from the servants' outing, and Hudson, using his various contacts, has the undertakers, Mr. Waterman and Mr. Lowe, take her body out of the house.

When told that she was more or less going to be used for medical research (as she was a Catholic who killed herself and could not be buried in consecrated ground, and was considered a mortal sinner), Hudson was rocked to the core, and sharply tells the undertakers that God will forgive her! and after praying for the Lord's mercy on her soul, Hudson wipes tears from his eyes. Emily's body is then carried from the house.

In the novelization of the scripts by John Hawkesworth, it is told that after Emily kills herself, the other Bellamy servants viciously condemn William, and Lady Marjorie severs all social contact with Mrs. Van Groeben and her family because of the tragedy. However, in the series' next episode, Why is Her Door Locked?, Lady Marjorie mentions that Mrs. Van Groeben raved about a dinner that Mrs. Bridges had prepared the previous night.

References

External links
Updown.org.uk - Upstairs, Downstairs'' Fansite

Upstairs, Downstairs (series 1) episodes
1972 British television episodes
Fiction set in 1907